Eucalyptus strzeleckii, commonly known as Strzelecki gum or wax-tip, is a species of small to medium-sized tree that is endemic to a small area of Victoria, Australia. It has smooth bark, sometimes with a few slabs of fibrous bark near the base, lance-shaped to egg-shaped or curved adult leaves, flower buds in groups of seven, white flowers and conical fruit.

Description
It has smooth, mottled cream-coloured, and pale brown bark, sometimes with a few slabs of rough, fibrous bark near the base. Flowering occurs in spring and the flowers are white.

Taxonomy and naming
Eucalyptus strzeleckii was first formally described in 1992 by Kevin James Rule in the journal Muelleria. The specific epithet (strzeleckii) honours Paul Strzelecki.

Distribution
Strzelecki gum mostly grows in small, pure stands on ridges, slopes and along stream banks. It occurs in the western part of the Strzelecki Ranges, mainly between Foster, Neerim South and Moe.

Conservation status
This eucalypt is classified as "vulnerable" under the Australian Government Environment Protection and Biodiversity Conservation Act 1999 and as "threatened" under the Victorian Government Flora and Fauna Guarantee Act 1988. The main threats to the species include grazing and trampling, weed invasion and habitat loss due to road works, firewood collection and agricultural activities. A recovery plan for the species has been prepared.

See also
List of Eucalyptus species

References

Flora of Victoria (Australia)
Trees of Australia
strzeleckii
Myrtales of Australia
Plants described in 1992